The Technics SL-J2 is a quartz-controlled direct-drive fully automatic turntable system produced by Technics between 1984 and 1988.  It features a linear tracking tonearm with an optical sensor that allows for the kind of track-skipping more typical of CD players.  The sensor also detects the size of the record sitting on the platter (7-inch, 10-inch, or 12-inch), which allows the needle to drop precisely on the first track.

Product description 

From the original Technics SL-J2 brochure:

"Who else but Technics could put so much high performance, and so many convenient features in such a slim body?  The SL-J2 features the outstanding rotational speed accuracy of quartz-referenced direct drive, and a linear tracking tonearm for perfect tracing accuracy.  The convenient skip/search/direct access function allows you to skip over selections you don't want to hear.  A separate, easy-to-read Music Select LED confirms your skip/search commands."

Features 

Also from the original SL-J2 brochure:

 Linear tracking tonearm with optoelectronic sensor detects any arm angle deflection, and automatically compensates to give optimum tracking performance
 Gimbal suspension system with low-friction ball-bearings gives superb tracking ability
 Equipped with the Technics-designed P-Mount cartridge connector system
 Automatic operation.  The SL-J2 automatically selects record size and speed.  All function keys are on the front panel, so operation can be carried out with the dust cover closed
 30cm (12") diameter aluminum diecast platter
 TNRC cabinet for effective protection against external vibrations and acoustic feedback
 Manual switching of disc size and speed to accommodate non-standard record formats
 Automatic stylus muting

Technical specifications 

Type: fully automatic turntable
Drive method: direct drive
Motor: DC motor
Drive control: quartz phase locked
Platter: 300mm aluminium die-cast
Speeds: 33 and 45rpm
Wow and flutter: 0.025% WRMS
Rumble: -78dB
Tonearm: linear tracking tonearm with 4-pivot gimbal suspension
Effective length: 105mm
Cartridge: moving magnet
Tracking force: 1.25g (+-0.25g)
Replacement stylus: EPS-30ES
Dimensions: 315 x 88 x 315mm
Weight: 4.3kg

Similar models 

The Technics SL-10, produced by Technics between 1981 and 1985, was the first linear-tracking turntable to feature direct drive.  
The SL-10 is also notable for being in the permanent collection of the Museum of Modern Art in New York.

Other direct-drive linear tracking turntables produced by Technics include the SL-15, SL-7, SL-6, SL-5, and SL-V5.

References

Turntables
1984 musical instruments
DJ equipment
Electronic musical instruments
Japanese inventions
Musical instruments invented in the 1980s
Panasonic products
Turntablism